Hindu Heritage Centre is a Hindu temple and a Hindu Community Centre located in the city of Mississauga, Ontario, in the Streetsville neighbourhood. The 25 000 square feet temple serves Hindus from the Greater Toronto Area and is considered to be one of the largest Hindu temples in Canada.
It features a 10,000 square foot prayer hall, 16 classrooms where daily meditations and scripture teachings are also offered, as are classes in Indian languages, Hindu music and dance, Hindu culture, yoga, and social programs for seniors, and a 9,000 square foot banquet hall also exists for cultural events.

History 
The 2.4 acre land was purchased in 2005, and construction commenced in late 2006. The temple officially opened on a three-day celebration from May 5 to May 8, 2011. Former Ontario Premier Dalton McGuinty along with Ontario Ministers Eric Hoskins and Charles Sousa and local MPP Bob Delaney from Mississauga Streetsville, attended the official ceremony.

In 2011, Hindu Heritage Centre was nominated as an architecture icon of Mississauga by Door Opens Mississauga. As a part of the Culture Days celebration, every year three days of the week in July are dedicated to this program where guided tours of the temple are available.

On November 11, 2017 The Canadian Armed Forces represented by the Toronto Scottish Regiment took part in the first Remembrance Day Ceremony to ever be held in a Hindu Temple in Canada's history. The Military first marched to the Hindu Heritage Centre. The ceremony then took place where Hindu pundits blessed the regimental colours and conducted a ceremony of remembrance for Canada’s fallen soldiers. The Hindu Priest did a Shanti Paath for all the soldiers who sacrificed their life for Freedom in both world wars.

The Centre maintains a link with the Consulate General of India. The consulate has held numerous events at the Hindu Heritage Centre such as consular camps for services such as pensioner life certificates, and other general briefing, including consultation and approval of documents for various services.

Main deities at the Temple 
Durga
Ganesha
Surya
Krishna and Radha
Narayana and Lakshmi
Shiva and Parvati
Rama and Sita
Lakshmana
Hanuman

Major festivals celebrated 

Navratri
Diwali
Maha Shivratri
Lohri
Makar Sankranti (Pongal)
Holi
Sri Rama Navami 
Karva Chauth

See also 

 World Hinduism
 Hinduism by country
 Hindu calendar
 List of Hindu temples
 Hindu temples in Canada
 List of Hindu deities
 List of Hinduism-related articles
 History of India
 Hindu scriptures

References 

" Mississauga Hindu Heritage Centre: Not only a temple, but a Cultural Centre also" South Asian Generation Next. May 11, 2011 pg 1 
"Much anticipated Hindu Heritage Centre opens" Chad  H. The Mississauga News. May 9, 2011. pg. C.25
"Premier joins Hindu Celebration" John Stewart. The Mississauga News. May 5, 2011. 
"Hindu Heritage Centre: More than a place of worship" Sunil Mehta Hindu Abroad.June 8, 2013 pg 4 C.10

External links 

 

Hindu temples in Canada
Buildings and structures in Mississauga